Sir Eruera Tihema Te Aika Tirikatene  (5 January 1895 – 11 January 1967) was a New Zealand Māori politician of the Ngāi Tahu tribe. Known in early life as Edward James Te Aika Tregerthen, he was the first Ratana Member of Parliament and was elected in a by-election for Southern Maori in June 1932 after the death of Tuiti Makitanara.

He remained the MP until his death in 1967, when his daughter Whetu Tirikatene-Sullivan succeeded to the seat, also in a by-election.

Early life
After education at St Stephen's Anglican Church, Tirikatene worked on farms before enlisting in 1914 for the First World War. He served three years with the New Zealand Māori (Pioneer) Battalion, reaching the rank of sergeant and commended for carrying a wounded soldier while under fire.

In 1919, he was married to Ruti Matekino Solomon and the couple went on to have twelve children. In the same year, he settled on a small farm near Kaiapoi, where he also set up a dairy farm, a saw mill, a fishing fleet and a ferry service. During the Second World War in 1944 their second son, Sergeant Pilot John Aperehama, aged 21, was killed in an aircraft accident in Auckland. He was buried at Te Kai A Te Atua Urupa, Kaiapoi.

By 1921 he visited Ratana pā, and T. W. Ratana, the spiritual leader or Te Mangai of Ratana predicted an important role for him.  Te Mangai persuaded him to stay, and with his practical skills, served the movement by taking charge of harvesting of the Ratana lands.

Election to Parliament
As the Ratana movement developed into a political movement, Eruera Tirikatene became a leader in the internal political council and stood for parliament in the 1928 and 1931 elections, being defeated narrowly in both. In 1928 he and most of his extended family spent the election at Ratana Pa helping with the wheat harvest.  At the time there were few provisions for absentee voting, and unable to even vote for himself, Tirikatene lost the election by one vote.

In June 1932, the sitting MP for Southern Maori, Tuiti Makitanara died suddenly and Eruera won the by-election to become the first Ratana MP. Tirikatene contained to represent his electorate until his death in January 1967. His initial majorities were small, only 43 in 1935.

Member of Parliament

From his maiden speech, Tirikatene made recognition of the Treaty of Waitangi one of his major aims, presenting a petition with over 30,000 signatures.  The petition from the Ratana morehu was held over for thirteen years before being virtually ignored, but Tirikatane continued to raise the Treaty issue in debates.

During the depression of that time, Māori were expected to subsist from their land, and were not given equal access to unemployment payments and relief work.  Proving entitlement to the old age pension was also more difficult for Māori, as Māori did not have to register births until 1919. Tirikatene spoke out against this discrimination in social welfare which caused poverty to Māori and the removal of this inequality by the Labour Government strengthened the Labour and Ratana bond.

Following the Ratana-Labour alliance, Tirikatene became the First President of the Labour Party Māori Advisory Council, a committee to set Māori policy for the party.  During the Second World War, Tirikatene set up and led the Māori War Effort Organisation.  The experience of Māori running their own affairs led him to introduce the Māori Social and Economic Advancement Act of 1945, but it did not give the independence for iwi he had hoped for.

Between 1946 and 1949, Tirikatene was involved in land claim settlements for Waikato—Maniapoto and Taranaki.  He persuaded the Ngāi Tahu to accept the Ngaitahu Claim Settlement Act of 1944 and became president of the Ngaitahu Trust Board.

After a period in opposition, he was appointed Minister of Forests, and Minister in charge of Printing and Stationery. Tirikatene was expecting Māori Affairs, which was taken by Prime Minister Walter Nash.  The two often clashed, with Tirikatene wanting greater autonomy for Māori.  One achievement of this period was the official recognition of Waitangi Day through the Waitangi Day Act 1960, commemorating the signing of Te Tiriti o Waitangi.

Tirikatene continued committee work while in opposition after 1960, and remained an MP until his death.  He was succeeded in the seat by his daughter, Whetu Tirikatene-Sullivan.

Recognition 

In 1935, Tirikatene was awarded the King George V Silver Jubilee Medal. In 1953, he was awarded the Queen Elizabeth II Coronation Medal. He was appointed a Knight Commander of the Order of St Michael and St George in the 1960 Queen's Birthday Honours. Within the Ratana movement, he was known as Te Omeka.

References 

New Zealand Labour Party MPs
Ngāi Tahu people
Rātana MPs
New Zealand Knights Commander of the Order of St Michael and St George
1895 births
1967 deaths
New Zealand Rātanas
New Zealand MPs for Māori electorates
Members of the New Zealand House of Representatives
Unsuccessful candidates in the 1928 New Zealand general election
Unsuccessful candidates in the 1931 New Zealand general election
New Zealand politicians awarded knighthoods